The Arboretum de Bains-les-Bains (2 hectares) is a historic arboretum located along the Canal de l'Est in the Parc de la Manufacture Royale de Fer blanc (established 1733), Bains-les-Bains, Vosges, Grand Est, France.

The arboretum is over 250 years old, and contains remarkable specimens of Castanea sativa, the rare Fagus sylvatica 'Tortuosa', Ginkgo biloba, Lawson cypress, and Sciadopitys verticillata, as well as American oak, cedar, Magnolia stellata, and Rhododendron ponticum. This site was also the location of Julie-Victoire Daubié's herbarium.

See also 
 List of botanical gardens in France

References 
 La Manufacture Royale de Bains-les-Bains
 L'Echo des Chênaies entry (French)
 Vosges Itinerances entry (French)
 Les Jardins de France entry (French)
 Canal Chateaux description

Bains-les-Bains, Arboretum de
Bains-les-Bains, Arboretum de